Keyvan may refer to:
Keyvan, Iran, a village
Keyvan Rural District, in Iran
Kayvan, a given name